Baseball was contested at the 1930 Central American and Caribbean Games in Havana, Cuba.

References
 

1930 Central American and Caribbean Games
1930
1930
Central American and Caribbean Games
Baseball competitions in Havana
1930s in Cuban sport